The Mercury Medalist is an automobile which was produced by Mercury for the 1956 model year and was similar to the Ford Customline in market segment.

The Medalist was introduced as a two-door sedan only in September 1955 as Mercury's low-price model. It was positioned below the Custom, Monterey and Montclair models and replaced the entry-level status the Custom previously held. A four-door sedan, a two door hardtop and a four-door hardtop were added midyear at which time the Medalist was given full series status. It was offered only with a 312 cubic inch V8 engine. The standard items included textured vinyl upholstery, rubber floor mats, and chrome front and rear window surround mouldings, and a rear quarter panel body side stainless steel trim. Optional items included a heater and windshield defroster, "Travel-Tuner" signal seeking AM radio, padded instrument panel, seat belts, power adjustable front seat, power windows, power steering, power brakes, white wall tires mounted on  steel wheels and auxiliary road lamps. All Mercury's for 1955 offered a canted hood over the headlights previously introduced on the Mercury XM-800 concept car from 1954.

For 1956, Mercury introduced two types of two-tone paint combinations, offering the traditional approach of a roof color over a different body color, and "Flo-tone" where the roof and lower body were painted in one color and the upper body painted in another color. There were a total of thirty-one two-tone combinations and twenty-eight "Flo-tone" combinations. The listed retail price was US$2,254 ($ in  dollars ) for the 2-Door Sedan and 20,582 were assembled.

The Medalist was discontinued along with the Custom for the 1957 model year with the Monterey now the base model in that year's Mercury range.

The Medalist returned in 1958 once again as the entry-level Mercury as either a 2-door or 4-door sedan and no hardtop roofline was offered. Sixteen standard colors were offered, along with cloth and vinyl upholstery, full carpeting, an electric clock, and chrome window surrounding on the front and rear windows. Two engine choices and a choice of either a 3-speed manual or Merc-O-Matic automatic transmission with available Touch-O-Matic overdrive were available as extra cost options. Other optional equipment listed heater and defroster, air conditioning, AM-radio, tinted glass, 4-way power adjustable front seat, power windows, power steering, power brakes, and a padded instrument panel. Production records show a total of 18,732 2-door and 4-door sedans were manufactured with an average listed price of US$2,582 ($ in  dollars ), and was the last year the Medalist nameplate was used.

References

External links

 1956 Mercury Prestige Brochure, www.oldcarbrochures.com
 1956 Mercury Medalist Brochure (side two of two), i.ebayimg.com, via web.archive.org

Medalist